The following lists events that happened during 1940 in Cape Verde.

Incumbents
Colonial governor: Amadeu Gomes de Figueiredo

Events
Population: 181,441
The Mission sui juris of Portuguese Guinea was separated from the Catholic diocese of Santiago de Cabo Verde

References

 
1940 in the Portuguese Empire
Years of the 20th century in Cape Verde
1940s in Cape Verde
Cape Verde
Cape Verde